WBGU may refer to:

 WBGU, the German Advisory Council on Global Change
 WBGU (FM), a radio station (88.1 FM) licensed to Bowling Green, Ohio, United States
 WBGU-TV, a television station (channel 22, virtual 27) licensed to Bowling Green, Ohio, United States
 Long Sukang Airport (ICAO code WBGU)